Atlas Fútbol Club Femenil is a Mexican women's football club based in Guadalajara, Jalisco. The club has been the female team of Club Atlas since 2017. The team currently plays in the Liga MX Femenil which started in July 2017.

Personnel

Management

Coaching staff

Players

Current squad
As of 16 July 2021

References

 
Liga MX Femenil teams
Association football clubs established in 2017
2017 establishments in Mexico